Givan may refer to:

American 
Harry Givan (1911–1999), American businessman
John Givan (1837–1895), Irish politician
Juandalynn Givan, American politician
Paul Givan (born 1981), Northern Irish politician
Richard M. Givan (1921–2009), American jurist

a city in Iran 
Nasrabad, Isfahan, a city in Iran
Givan, West Azerbaijan, a village in Iran

See also
Senoj-Jay Givans, Jamaican sprinter